Be With You is the second album by Japanese singer Megumi Nakajima. It features various anime tie-in songs as well as new collaborations with artists such as Yoko Kanno and Dance Man.

Seven songs featured in the album were previously used in various animated media. "Try Unite!" and "Hello!" were used as the opening and ending themes respectively for the 2012 anime television series Lagrange: The Flower of Rin-ne. "Melody" and "Natsudori" were used as the ending themes to the Tamayura anime OVA, while "Kamisama no Itazura" was later used as the ending theme to the Tamayura: Hitotose anime television. "Koi" and "Tsunagaru Made" were featured in the 2011 anime television Sacred Seven as an insert song and the final episode ending theme, respectively.

Track listing

Limited Edition Bonus DVD
The Limited Edition version of the album comes with a special DVD recording of the  concert, which was recorded at Liquidroom Ebisu on June 4, 2011.

References

2012 albums
Victor Entertainment albums